A sich is an administrative and military center for Cossacks. 

Sich can also refer to:

Volunteer organizations 
 Sich movement, a Ruthenian national movement of Austria-Hungary existed in 1861-1947; influenced the creation of several other Ukrainian organization of Central and Eastern Europe as well as North America
 Sports Society Sich, a Ukrainian sports volunteer organization of firefighters (est. 1902)
 Sich (scouting) (Січ), a Ukrainian Scout organization
 Ukrainian Sich Riflemen (Ukrayínski sichoví striltsí) — a Ukrainian unit within the Austro-Hungarian army during World War I, based on volunteer sportsmen of the Sports Society Sich; later it laid a base for creation of the Ukrainian Galician Army
 Sich Riflemen, one of the regular military units of the Army of the Ukrainian People's Republic, created out of the Russian-detained Austrian soldiers (Ukrainian Sich Riflemen)
 Polissian Sich (Polisska sich), a name for the Ukrainian People's Revolutionary Army (World War II) in the region of Polissya
 Carpathian Sich of the National Defense Organization (Karpatska sich) — a Ukrainian unit in Carpatho-Ukraine (1938-39)

Other 
 Sich, Iran, a village in South Khorasan Province, Iran
 Motor Sich, a company in Zaporizhia, Ukraine that manufactures engines for airplanes and helicopters
 Motor Sich Airlines, an airline based in Zaporizhia, Ukraine
 Sich-1, a Ukrainian Earth observation satellite
 Sich a Getting Up Stairs, an American song from the early 1830s
 Scottish dialect of English form of the word "such"

Acronym
 Symptomatic intracerebral hemorrhage

Or see
Sech (disambiguation)